Kyle Wood (born 18 June 1989) is an English rugby league footballer who plays as a  for Halifax Panthers in the RFL Championship. He is meant to have penned a 2 year deal to the Super League with Hull KR.

He has played for Doncaster in 2008 National League Two and the Sheffield Eagles in the Championship. Wood then played for the Huddersfield Giants in the Super League, spending time on loan from Huddersfield at the Batley Bulldogs and Sheffield in the Champsionship, and the Castleford Tigers (Heritage No. 908) in the Super League. He moved to the Wakefield Trinity Wildcats in the top flight, before returning to the Giants in the Super League.

Background
Wood was born in Castleford, West Yorkshire, England.

Career
While with the Huddersfield Giants, Kyle was on a dual-contract with the Batley Bulldogs.

Halifax Panthers
On 9 Nov 2021 it was reported that he had signed for Halifax Panthers in the RFL Championship

References

External links
Wakefield Trinity profile
Huddersfield Giants profile
SL profile
Super League 2012: Dave Woods' guide

1989 births
Living people
Batley Bulldogs players
Castleford Tigers players
Doncaster R.L.F.C. players
English rugby league players
Halifax R.L.F.C. players
Huddersfield Giants players
Rugby league halfbacks
Rugby league players from Castleford
Sheffield Eagles players
Wakefield Trinity players